The first Inter-Cities Fairs Cup took place over three seasons from 1955 to 1958. The competition began with a group stage with each team playing home and away against each other. Due to the competition rules which stated only one side from each city was allowed to compete, many cities with several football clubs picked the best players from those teams to create a city representative side. One of these, the London XI, went on to reach the final where they were beaten over two legs by the Barcelona XI (later recognized as FC Barcelona).

Group stage

Group A

Group B

Group C

Group D

Knockout stage

Teams playing first leg at home shown first.
Birmingham City and Barcelona required a play-off after their semi-final finished level on aggregate. The play-off was played in Switzerland.

Semi-finals

1 Barcelona beat Birmingham City 2–1 in a play-off to qualify for the Final.

First leg

Second leg

Play-off

Final

First leg

Second leg

Notes

References

External links
 UEFA Inter-Cities Fair Cup results at Rec.Sport.Soccer Statistics Foundation
 Inter-Cities Fairs Cup Seasons 1955-58 – results, protocols
 website eurocups-uefa.ru Fairs' Cup Seasons 1955-58 – results, protocols
 website Football Archive 1955–58 Fairs' Cup

2
2
2
Inter-Cities Fairs Cup seasons